The Ministry of Cultural Affairs is a ministry in the Government of Maharashtra. Ministry is responsible for promoting regional culture. 

The Ministry is headed by a cabinet level minister. Sudhir Mungantiwar is current Minister of Cultural Affairs. Cabinet Minister is assisted by the Minister of State. Vacant, TBD
since 29 June 2022.

Head office

List of Cabinet Ministers

List of Ministers of State

List of Principal Secretary

Cultural centers
Ministry has various cultural centers across Maharashtra. Urdu Culture Center in Nanded is named after Bollywood actor Dilip Kumar.

References

External links

Government ministries of Maharashtra
Maharashtra
Maharashtra